Silver Cross Records is alternative rock and heavy metal label founded in Belgrade, Serbia.  Officially started in March of 1993 label was disbanded in 1997.  In the middle of war in Yugoslavia this label propagated anti-war messages to the public in Serbia, in the form of anti-war music projects.

The main project for this label is “Witness of the 1st Discussion” compilation album which includes 9 bands.  The message "dedicated to all young people fled from their country running away from a senseless war." is printed in the booklet
The cover page is the blackest possible and this is also perverse and warning message associated with music that stretches over 16 songs sung in English 

Silver Cross Records has been awarded as the best music company in Serbia for 1995 by Index Radio.

Artists 
Artists that have been signed and published for Silver Cross Records include:
Avangarda+
Dead Ideas
Definite Choice
Urgh! (band)
Eyesburn
Rapid Force
Bloodbath(Serbia)
Wulckdroff
Gymnastics(Laka Gimnastika)
Stentor
Bad Taste
Pure
Hitman
Stand Point
Austerity

Cover artwork

References

See also
 List of record labels

Serbian record labels
Record labels established in 1993
Rock record labels
Serbian brands